Gopal Menon (born 29 April 1974) is an Indian documentary film director, producer and cinematographer known for his activism through social action documentaries. He has made films on violence, religious fundamentalism, nationality question, state repression, human rights, environment, caste, gender and sexuality. Gopal Menon's notable works include "Hey Ram: Genocide in the Land of Gandhi", "Naga Story: The Other Side of Silence", "PAPA 2", "Resilient Rhythms", "Marching Towards Freedom" and "The Unholy War".

Education 
He completed his BA in English from University of Calicut, Kerala and holds a Master’s in Business Administration from PSG College of Technology, Coimbatore. He hasn't received any formal training in Film making

Professional career
Gopal started his film career with a documentary on the destruction of tropical evergreen forests in the Nilgiri biosphere. While still a student of Business Administration, he started working with the People's Union for Civil Liberties (PUCL) on the organized violence on Muslims in Coimbatore, Tamil Nadu, and the subsequent bomb blasts in the city.

Films on Communalism
Gopal Menon is known for very fast responses to religious fundamentalism and communal riots.  His film Hey Ram: Genocide in the Land of Gandhi, on the 2002 Gujarat riots, was the first on the subject  within three weeks after the riots, and was widely screened across the world including 16 cities in the U.S., and across Europe, Japan and South Asia.

Gopal's 2014 films "The Killing Fields of Muzzaffarnagar",  "The Unholy War - Part 1: In the Name of Development" and "The Unholy War - Part 2: In Search of Justice" Addresses communalism and religious fundamentalism deeper and its links with nationality questions, riots and development.  The Killing Fields of Muzzaffarnagar is about 2013 Muzaffarnagar riots, which is described as"the worst violence in Uttar Pradesh in recent history" resulted in at least 62 deaths, injured 93 and left more than 50,000 displaced. This film captures narratives of the survivors plight, anguish, sorrows and helplessness of riots victims and investigates into the ploy of the hate politics played out by the Hindu right wing organizations in Western UP to tear apart the social fabric for electoral games. The film has  footage of live riots, people with guns and swords on the road, houses and shops burning and provocative speeches in the maha panchayat.

The 2 part film "The Unholy War" is in the context of Narendra Modi's campaign in 2014 elections in India highlighting Gujarat's development under Modi. "The Unholy War - Part 1: In the Name of Development" film follows and exposes Narendra Modi's claims of Gujarat Development through a collage of individual testimonies around the issues of farmer suicides, education, water, agriculture and land grab. "The Unholy War - Part 2: In Search of Justice" then goes on to document the encounter killings in post 2002 Gujarat riots and complicity of the state in perpetrating a reign of terror by following cases running in various courts and tribunals. film Screening got disrupted by police in [Jawaharlal Nehru University], Five jeep-loads of police officers prevented his screening in Ahmadabad and many times he denied a venue

Films on Conflicts
He has been video documenting the Naga and Kashmiri political movements since 1998. He has directed Naga Story: The Other Side of Silence on the Naga struggle in 2003  and PAPA 2 on enforced disappearances in Kashmir in 2000 from this documentation .

The film  Naga Story: The Other Side of Silence provides an introduction to the history of the Struggle by Naga people in North- East frontier of Indian subcontinent, and documents the human rights abuses suffered by the Naga people in more than 50 years of the existence of Independent India. The Naga political struggle is one of the oldest nationality movements in South Asia, continuing till present times.  This film, which took five years to complete, is the first comprehensive film about the Naga struggle for identity, self-determination, peace, and justice.

"Papa 2" is a film about the notorious interrogation centre, Papa 2.  This interrogation center was run by the Indian Armed Forces in Kashmir till 1996. The film, PAPA 2, documents the struggle of the mothers and wives of disappeared persons to trace their loved ones. It features interviews with the families of the affected people and also members of the Association of Parents of Disappeared People.

Films on Manual Scavenging and Dalit causes
Gopal has directed several films on the issues affecting dalit. Resilient Rhythms (64 minutes/India/ 2002) documents a range of responses to the  marginalization of Dalits, from armed struggle to electoral politics.. His 2005 film Of Inhuman Bondage on manual scavenging, showed women and children cleaning up the shit of 'Shining India', determined to salvage their soiled pride  His more detailed 2010 film on manual scavengers is titled Marching Towards Freedom. This film shot across 18 states in India captures the lives of people engaged in manual scavenging, their quest for justice, the denial of authorities to grant them a life of dignity and the effect of the Safai Karamchari Andolan on their lives.  His film Your Slaves No Longer is on the land struggles of Musahars a Dalit community in the states of Bihar and Uttar Pradesh in  India .

Other involvements
He has worked as Location Director for a Channel 4 News report on the funding of Hindu Extremist organizations and shot the film in UK and India. This film – Hindu Nationalism in Britain – was telecast in UK on the day of the Gujarat elections and was widely reported in the Indian media as well. The report has subsequently been tabled in the British Parliament.

His campaign films Twice Evicted and Caste Out have been on the tsunami and its aftermath.

Awards
Gopal's films have been screened at several film festivals. His film "Naga Story: The Other Side of Silence" was presented the 'Spirit of the Himalayas' First Prize at The Netherlands Himalayas Film Festival, Amsterdam, 2004. His film "Let the Butterflies Fly" on the condition of transgender people in India, won the Best Feature-Length Documentary Award at Kashish 2012, the Mumbai Queer Film Festival.

Filmography

As Producer and Director

As Director and cinematographer

As Location Director and Cameraman
 ‘Hindu Nationalism in Britain’, Produced by Channel 4 News

References

Indian documentary filmmakers
Living people
Film directors from Kerala
Artists from Palakkad
1974 births
Kendriya Vidyalaya alumni
Film producers from Kerala
University of Calicut alumni